Lessardia is a genus of dinoflagellates belonging to the family Lessardiaceae.

Species:
 Lessardia elongata Saldarriaga & F.J.R.Taylor

References

Dinophyceae
Dinoflagellate genera